Elis Johansson (29 August 1897 – 10 December 1956) was a Swedish middle-distance runner. He competed in the men's 800 metres at the 1920 Summer Olympics.

References

External links
 

1897 births
1956 deaths
Athletes (track and field) at the 1920 Summer Olympics
Swedish male middle-distance runners
Olympic athletes of Sweden
Place of birth missing